Cuscuta epilinum is a species of flowering plant belonging to the family Convolvulaceae.

Its native range is Iran to Central Asia.

References

epilinum